Jesse Martin, OAM (born 26 August 1981), is a German-Australian sailor who in 1999 became the youngest person to circumnavigate the globe solo, non-stop and unassisted, Martin's journey in the  S&S 34 sloop Lionheart-Mistral took approximately 11 months. He chronicled his adventures in the book Lionheart: A Journey of the Human Spirit, and his story was made into a documentary, Lionheart: The Jesse Martin Story.

Lionheart voyage
At 16, Martin departed Melbourne for a world voyage on his yacht, Lionheart. He arrived back in Melbourne on 31 October 1999 and sailed into the record books at age 18. Since Martin's voyage, the World Sailing Speed Record Council (WSSRC) have discontinued the "youngest" category and no longer recognise "human condition" records. Martin remains the youngest solo non-stop unassisted sailor to cross opposite points of the globe in a single round-the-world voyage. His voyage inspired other young sailors, including Jessica Watson, to attempt similar circumnavigations.

The voyage was sponsored by Mistral, the Melbourne newspaper the Herald Sun, the Sandringham Yacht Club, Kodak, REV milk and Autohelm. Mistral was the major sponsor, donating over A$300,000 on the conditions that the name was placed on the sail, prominently and repeatedly on the boat, on the bottom of Martin's weekly newspaper column, and on Martin's clothing.

Prior to the Lionheart voyage Martin, along with his father and brother, completed a 1,000 km journey along the North Queensland coast in a 14-foot Caper Cat, one of the longest attempted in a catamaran of its size. In an interview following the trip, Martin stated that the journey made the idea of sailing around the world seem possible.

Post Lionheart activities
Martin lives in Melbourne, Australia, and has started a media production company, as well as a Papua New Guinea sailing adventure charter business. In 2005, he released a follow-up book entitled Kijana: The Real Story. In January 2009 Martin walked away uninjured after crashing his car into a train at a railway level crossing at McKinnon railway station in Melbourne. In 2010 Martin shared producing and directing credits for 5 Lost at Sea, a film documenting an attempted second circumnavigational voyage, this time with several friends.

Awards
Martin was the Australian Yachting Federation's Youth Sailor of the Year for the year 1999–2000 and the Young Victorian of the Year in 2000. He was awarded the Centenary Medal in 2001 and the Medal of the Order of Australia (OAM) in 2002.

See also
 List of youth solo sailing circumnavigations

References

External links
 BBC news article on Jesse Martin
 
 IMDB entry for Lionheart: The Jesse Martin Story
 Jesse Martin - Inspirational Speaker - Adventurer - Sailor - Lionheart

1981 births
Living people
Australian sailors
Australian travel writers
People educated at Wesley College (Victoria)
Recipients of the Centenary Medal
Recipients of the Medal of the Order of Australia
Teenage single-handed circumnavigating sailors
Single-handed circumnavigating sailors